Gorišnica is a settlement in the Municipality of Gorišnica in Slovenia. The area traditionally belonged to the  region of Styria. It is now included in the Drava Statistical Region.

The parish church in the village is dedicated to Saint Margaret and belongs to the Roman Catholic Archdiocese of Maribor. It was first mentioned in written documents dating to 1391, but the current building dates to the early 19th century.

Gallery

References

External links
 Gorišnica municipal site
 Gorišnica on Geopedia

Populated places in the Municipality of Gorišnica